"I Want To (Do Everything for You)" is a 1965 R&B hit written and performed by Joe Tex. The single was his second number one on the R&B chart in the U.S., where it stayed for three weeks.  "I Want To (Do Everything for You)" was also Joe Tex's second Top 40 entry on the Billboard Hot 100.

Other Versions
The song has been covered by other artists, among them: 
Huey Lewis and the News
Nazareth

Chart positions

See also
List of number-one R&B singles of 1965 (U.S.)

References

1965 singles
Joe Tex songs
Songs written by Joe Tex
Nazareth (band) songs
1965 songs